The Loyola Greyhounds men's basketball team represents Loyola University Maryland in National Collegiate Athletic Association Division I competition. They are currently led by third-year head coach Tavaras Hardy. It became a member of the Patriot League along with the university's other intercollegiate athletic programs on July 1, 2013. Home matches are played at Reitz Arena.

History
The program participated in the first interracial American basketball game played south of the Mason–Dixon line at Hurt Gymnasium on February 12, 1952, a 65–63 win over Morgan State.

Upon moving up from Division II in 1981, Loyola was an original member of the ECAC Metro Conference which changed its name to the Northeast Conference (NEC) on August 1, 1988. During its eight seasons in the circuit, the Greyhounds never won the championship and had no appearances in either the NCAA or National Invitation Tournaments. The only player in the program's Division I history to have reached the National Basketball Association (NBA) is Mike Morrison, a four-year letterman from 1985 to 1989. An All-Conference First Team as a junior and senior, he was selected by the Phoenix Suns in the second round (51st overall) of the 1989 NBA draft. He was eventually named to the NEC 25th Anniversary All-Time Team in January 2006. Mark Amatucci was also honored as the circuit's Jim Phelan Coach of the Year in 1983–84.

Loyola was a member of the Metro Atlantic Athletic Conference (MAAC) from 1989 to 2013. The Greyhounds won the MAAC Championship to earn the automatic bid into the NCAA tournament twice. The first time was in 1993–94 with an 80–75 win over Manhattan at Knickerbocker Arena and Tracy Bergan earning conference tournament Most Valuable Player (MVP) honors. This was also Skip Prosser's only campaign as the program's head coach. The Greyhounds' next conference title came 18 years later in 2012 with MVP Erik Etherly spearheading a 48–44 victory over Fairfield at MassMutual Center. Jimmy Patsos was the MAAC Coach of the Year that season. The MAAC era at Loyola ended with Patsos' departure to Siena on April 2, 2013.

G.G. Smith, an assistant coach under Patsos for six seasons, was promoted to lead the Greyhounds into the Patriot League on April 12, 2013. He announced his resignation on March 8, 2018 after five seasons in which the team posted 56–98 and 35–55 records overall and in the conference respectively.

Tavaras Hardy, an assistant coach on Josh Pastner's staff at Georgia Tech for two years, was appointed as Smith's successor 20 days later on March 28. His third campaign at Loyola ended with the Greyhounds advancing to its first Patriot League Championship Game in an 85–72 loss at Colgate on March 14, 2021 despite entering the tournament as the No. 9 seed.

NCAA Division I seasons

 Due to the COVID-19 pandemic, the Patriot League for the 2020–21 season was temporarily divided into three regional mini-conferences based on geography. Each team played a 16-game regular-season schedule which included four matches against each regional opponent. As usual, listed standings position reflected by conference tournament seed.

Sources: Loyola University Maryland Men's Basketball Year-By-Year Records; Northeast Conference 2012–13 Men's Basketball Record Book; Metro Atlantic Athletic Conference Men's Basketball All-Time Standings.

Postseason tournaments

NCAA Division I Tournament results
The Greyhounds have made two appearances in the NCAA Division I men's basketball tournament. Their combined record is 0–2.

CBI results
The Greyhounds have appeared in one College Basketball Invitational (CBI). Their record is 1–1.

CIT results
The Greyhounds have appeared in one CollegeInsider.com Postseason Tournament (CIT). Their record is 2–1.

NCAA Division II tournament results
The Greyhounds have appeared in the NCAA Division II tournament one time. Their record is 1–2.

NAIA tournament results
The Greyhounds have appeared in the NAIA tournament four times. Their combined record is 2–4.

References

External links